Diva Omran (also Romanized as Dīvā ʿOmrān) is a village in Khvosh Rud Rural District, Bandpey-ye Gharbi District, Babol County, Mazandaran Province, Iran. At the 2006 census, its population was 323, in 93 families.

References 

Populated places in Babol County